Higer Bus Company Limited, also known as Higer Bus, is a Chinese bus manufacturer based in Suzhou, Jiangsu province. It was established at the end of 1998. HIGER is China's leading exporter of buses and coaches, whose units are available in more than 100 countries and territories in South Asia, Middle East, Africa, Russia, East Europe and the Americas. In 2015, HIGER reached again a new breakthrough with more than RMB 11.7 billion sales revenue. Awarded with "China Top Brand", "National Inspection-free Product" and other honors, HIGER has made its way to China's Top 500 Most Valued Brands with a brand value of RMB14.492 billion, becoming the fastest growing company in China's bus industry, a base for exporting national finished automobiles and one of the Top 100 enterprises in informationalization in China.

History

Higer Bus Company Limited was established in December 1998. Below are some of the company milestones leading up to today:
 In September 1999, 1000 complete pedal powered bus vehicles were manufactured.
 In June 2003, a new 400,000 square meter factory was established and put into production in Suzhou Industrial Park (SIP).
 In July 2003, HIGER successfully passed the international ISO/TS16949 certification issued by the International Automotive Task Force (IATF) and the "Technical Committee" of ISO.
 In February 2004, HIGER V8 Series bus was officially launched into the market.
 In March 2004, HIGER was awarded with the "Best Safety Equipment Prize" at the BAAV World Bus Exposition.
 In May 2005, HIGER Bus Customer Service Call Center was officially put into operation, becoming the first bus industry specific customer center in China and North Korea.
 In December 2005, HIGER's annual output and sales exceeded 10,000 units for the first time.
 In September 2006, HIGER launched the A80 export-based luxury bus in cooperation with the Swedish bus manufacturer Scania.
 In December 2006, 500 HIGER bus units served the 15th Asian Games in Doha, Qatar.
 In March 2007, HIGER and Scania jointly researched and developed the Scania Higer A90 High-class Deluxe Coach.
 In August 2008, 1500 HIGER bus units served at the 29th Summer Olympic Games held in Beijing, China.
 On January 18, 2009, HIGER Bus Company Limited celebrated the 10th anniversary of its establishment.
 In March 2009, HIGER passed the requirements of the Inspection Exemption of Import and Export Commodities from the Chinese National Administration.
 In July 2010, HIGER Bus G-BOS System was launched. The system integrates the functions of GPS, driving recorder, fuel consumption recorder, maintenance management, remote breakdown analysis and stitches matching.
 In December 2010, the company made a sales achievement of 20,000 vehicles a year.
 In June 2011, HIGER started to manufacture light commercial vehicles.
 In September 2012, the HIGER Light Duty Vehicle plant in Kunshan was set into production.
 On May 19, 2013, the foundation laying ceremony of the HIGER New Energy Bus plant was officially held. The first phase of the project amounted to 1.5 billion Chinese Yuan. After its completion, the annual production capacity of the base will reach 10,000 new energy bus units.
 On May 22, 2013, HIGER launched G-POWERS II W16 Racing Bus at the Beijing International Exhibition of Buses, Trucks and Vehicle Components.
 In September 2013, the First HIGER American Business Conference was held in Santiago de Chile. The conference was attended by HIGER distributors from 12 countries and regions, including US, Mexico, Costa Rica, Trinidad and Tobago, Ecuador, Uruguay, Paraguay, Brazil, Peru, Bolivia, Panama and Chile.
 In 2014, after 16 years of constant research and growth, HIGER sales exceeded 10 billion Chinese Yuan.
 On June 16, 2015, the annual list of China's 500 Most Valuable Brands was officially released in Beijing. According to World Brand Lab, based on financial data analysis, consumer behavior and brand influence, Higer made its way into the list for eight consecutive years, ranking the 129th place in 2015, up from last year's 134th place, with a brand value reaching 20.286 billion RMB.

Models
HIGER produce 6 major series products: Coach; City Bus; New Energy Bus & Coach; School Bus; BRT; Van.

Coaches
HIGER Bus A Series are luxury coaches jointly launched by HIGER and Scania, including A80, A50, A30, A90, A98, etc.
 A30 - sold in Europe and Australia as an intercity or school bus
 A50
 A80 - sold in Europe and other export markets as the Scania Touring HD (A80T)
 A90 KLQ6127Q
 A95 KLQ6127D
 A98 KLQ6147S
HIGER Bus V Series
 V90 KLQ6109
 V92/91 KLQ6129/KLQ6119
 V91 KLQ6119T
 V92 KLQ6129T
HIGER New H Series
 H92 KLQ6142B
 Dreamscape
 H92 KLQ6122D
 H91 KLQ6112HA
Classic H Series
 H92 KLQ6125A/B
 H94 KLQ6145D
 H94 KLQ6145B
 H92/H91 KLQ6125/KLQ6115

City Bus

HIGER Bus B Series
 B98H KLQ6181G
 B94H KLQ6140GQ
 B92H KLQ6129GQ1
 B90H KLQ6109G
 B90V KLQ6108G
 B8H KLQ6850G
 B7H KLQ6770G
 KLQ6119GS
 KLQ6903G

Energy Efficient Bus

 Hybrid Electric City Bus (KLQ6129GHEV, KLQ6109GHEV, KLQ6129GQHEV)
 Hydrogen Fuel Bus (KLQ6129GQH2)
 Electric Bus (KLQ6129GEV, KLQ6125GEV, Hypers(KLQ6109GEV))
 Natural Gas City Bus (KLQ6129GC, KLQ6119GC, KLQ6108GC)
 Natural Gas Road Bus (H92-KLQ6125B1C, H90-KLQ6115HQC, H8-KLQ6858C)
 Higer Steed EV

School Bus

City Bus

KLQ6116X 53+2+1 seats
 KLQ6106X 53+2+1 seats
 KLQ6896X 46+2+1 seats
 KLQ6806X 39+1+1 seats
 KLQ6756X 38+1+1 seats
 KLQ6606X 23+1+1 seats
 KLQ6590X 18 seats

Bus Rapid Transit
 KLQ6181G 161/38+1

Light Duty Vehicles
HIGER Light-duty Vehicle Division was established in March 2010. The existing business purpose vehicle (H5V), H5C, Higer pickup (H5P) covers business, passenger, touring, commuter, logistic and many other industries.  
Higer H4E
Higer H5V
Higer H5C/ Higer H6C
Higer Yujun (H5P)
Higer Paradise (H5V/H6V)
Higer H7V
Higer Longwei

Gallery

References

External links

 

Bus manufacturers of China
Manufacturing companies based in Suzhou
Vehicle manufacturing companies established in 1998
Chinese companies established in 1998
Chinese brands